Did You Ever Have a Family is the debut novel by American literary agent and author Bill Clegg, published in 2015.

Plot summary
The novel focuses on June Reid, a beautiful, rich Connecticut woman. On the night before her daughter's wedding, June Reid loses her daughter, her daughter's fiancé, her ex-husband, and her boyfriend in a tragic house fire. Grief-stricken, she drives across the country to Washington. Over the course of her journey, details slowly emerge about what caused the fire and its impact on the community.

Characters 
 June Reid – bereaved mother, girlfriend and ex-wife
 Luke Morey – June's boyfriend
 Silas Riley – teenager employed by Luke
 Cissy – The Moonstone's housekeeper
 Lydia Morey née Hannafin – Luke's mother
 Rebecca – co-owner of The Moonstone hotel, Kelly's girlfriend
 Kelly – co-owner of The Moonstone hotel, Rebecca's girlfriend
 Lolly Reid – June's daughter
 Will Landis – Lolly's fiancé
 Adam – June's ex-husband
 Winton – lottery scammer
 Edith – florist hired for Lolly and Will's wedding
 Rick – son of the caterer hired for Lolly and Will's wedding
 Dale Landis – Will's father
 George – businessman, Luke's father
 Rex – Lydia's ex-boyfriend
 Ben – Cissy's deceased husband 
 Earl Morey – Lydia's ex-husband

Reception 
Did You Ever Have a Family received favourable reviews from, amongst others, The New York Times, the Financial Times, The Guardian and The Independent.

In The New York Times, Kaui Hart Hemmings called the novel "masterly" and "thoughtful", noting that it is the characters' "complicated pasts... far more than the immediate concerns of the present or the obvious burdens of grief" and "connection — the way people and their lives fuse" that Clegg is interested in exploring.

In the Financial Times, Suzi Feay noted that Clegg has "an eye for characters who cannot easily fit into the boxes that society has assigned" even if the main protagonist "June remains a puzzle, and hazily unconvincing". While praising Clegg for his ability to "not fall into the obvious trap of giving regular characters bigger vocabularies and more elaborate syntax than they would typically use", she also criticised his writing for being "generally plain and even unambitious", with the cast of characters' voices "not hugely differentiated".

Recognition
 2015 - National Book Award, longlist
 2015 - Man Booker Prize, longlist

References

2015 American novels
2015 debut novels
Gallery Books books